The French Polar Institute Paul-Émile Victor (Institut polaire français Paul-Émile Victor, IPEV) has been the organization leading the French National Antarctic Program since 1992. 

Based in Plouzané, Finistère, it operates the Dumont d'Urville Station and jointly operates the Concordia Station with the Italians and the AWIPEV Arctic Research Station with the Germans.

See also 
 List of organizations based in Antarctica

References

External links 
 Official Site of IPEV

Antarctic agencies